The UFCW Local 832 is a local union of the United Food and Commercial Workers union.

History 
Founded in 1938, Local 832 was approximately 700 members strong by 1964 when Bernard Christophe was elected president. Christophe held the presidency of Local 832 until ending his 38-year stretch as head of the local by stepping down in 2002 . He was replaced by Robert Ziegler in the fall of 2002, who held the office until he recently retired on December 1, 2011.  On October the 24th, 2011, the local's executive board elected Jeff Traeger to be the local's third full-time president in its 73-year history.  Jeff had been the treasurer since 2004, and Beatrice Bruske was also elected by the board to serve the remainder of Jeff's term as Secretary/Treasurer (the 1st female in an executive administrative role in the local's history).

The local was recently successful in organizing a group of Mexican agricultural workers at Mayfair Foods. Although enough workers signed union cards to automatically certify in September 2006, a series of disputes before the Manitoba Labour Board pushed back their certification until June 26, 2007  This certification has national importance, they became the first group of organized foreign farm workers in Canada.

See also

 UFCW Local 1776, Philadelphia

References

Trade unions established in 1938
United Food and Commercial Workers
Organizations based in Winnipeg
Trade unions in Manitoba